Willow Canyon High School is a high school in Surprise, Arizona, U.S., under the jurisdiction of the Dysart Unified School District.

Signature programs

TV / Media Production
This program is designed to provide students with the experience and skills needed to pursue a career in video production.

Cambridge Program
International General Certificate of Secondary Education.

International Baccalaureate Program (IB)
Willow Canyon is certified to offer the IB Diploma and coursework. The IB Program is a demanding pre-university course of
study that leads to examinations. It is designed for highly motivated secondary school students aged 16 to 19.

Medical Lab Assistant
Medical Lab Assisting is designed for students interested in any clinical-medical profession and offers hands-on experiences
in the classroom lab including expertise in phlebotomy procedures, capillary punctures, urinalysis and blood smears.

Sports teams

Willow Canyon has sports teams available for boys and girls.

References

Public high schools in Arizona
Educational institutions established in 2003
Schools in Maricopa County, Arizona
Education in Surprise, Arizona
International Baccalaureate schools in Arizona
2003 establishments in Arizona